Chazz is an English masculine given name and nickname that is a diminutive form of Charles. Notable people with this name include the following:

Nickname
Chazz Miller, nickname of Charles Miller (born 1963), American street art muralist
Chazz Palminteri, stagename of Calogero Lorenzo Palminteri (born 1952), American actor, screenwriter, producer and playwright
Chazz Young, stagename of Charles Young (born 1932), American choreographer

Given name
Chazz Anderson (born 1989), American football player
Chazz Surratt (born 1997), American football player 
Chazz Witherspoon (born 1981), American heavyweight boxer
Chazz Woodson (born 1982), American lacrosse player

Fictional characters
Chazz Darby, Brendan Fraser character in 1994 film, Airheads
Chazz Michaels, (Charles Michael Michaels), Will Ferrell character in 2007 film, Blades of Glory
Chazz Princeton, Yu-Gi-Oh! GX character
Chazz Reinhold, uncredited Will Ferrell character in 2005 film, Wedding Crashers
Chazz Russell, Matthew Perry character in 1987 TV series Second Chance

See also

Chanz (disambiguation)
Chaz
Chazy (disambiguation)

Notes

English masculine given names